Leptostreptus caudiculatus, is a species of round-backed millipede in the family Harpagophoridae. It is native to India (madras) and Sri Lanka (Rambodde, Pundaluoya, Balangoda).

References

Spirostreptida
Millipedes of Asia
Animals described in 1881
Arthropods of Sri Lanka
Arthropods of India